A Terminal controller is a device that collects traffic from a set of terminals and directs them to a concentrator.

References

Telecommunications equipment